True Love is the second studio album by saxophonist Jessy J, released through Peak Records on August 4, 2009. It includes the Groove Jazz Music number-one single "Tropical Rain". That song also reached number one on the R&R and Billboard Jazz charts. The album was released on August 4, 2009, and produced by Paul Brown.

Track listing
 "Tropical Rain" (Gregg Karukas, Paul Brown, Jessy J) – 4:15
 "Forever" (Paul Brown, Jessy J, Thomas Klemperer) – 4:08
 "True Love" (Jessy J) – 3:48
 "Mr. Prince" (Jessy J, Paul Brown) – 3:58
 "Morning of the Carnival" from Black Orpheus (Manha Dee Carnaval) (Louiz Bonfa, Antonio Maria) – 3:58
 "Somewhere in a Dream" (Jessy J, Paul Brown) – 4:15
 "Jessy's Blues" (Jessy J, Paul Brown" – 3:39
 "Llegaste tú" (Pablo Aguirre, Paulina Aguirre, Jessy J) – 3:40
 "Brazilian Dance" (Sergio Aranda) – 3:51
 "Baila!" (Jessy J, Paul Brown) – 3:47

Personnel 
Musicians
 Jessy J – tenor saxophone (1-5, 7, 10), flute (1, 5, 7, 10), arrangements (3-7, 10), vocals (5, 6, 8, 10), soprano saxophone (6, 9)
 Gregg Karukas – keyboards (1, 4-7), arrangements (1, 5), acoustic piano (2, 3, 7, 10), strings (2-6, 10), bass (5)
 Pablo Aguirre – programming (8)
 Sergio Aranda – acoustic piano (9), vocals (9)
 Tommy Kay – guitars (2), arrangements (2)
 Tom Strahle – guitars (8)
 Roberto Vally – bass (1-4, 6, 7, 10), chorus vocals (10)
 Sergio Gonzalez – drums (1, 3, 4, 6, 7, 10)
 Paul Brown – arrangements (1, 2, 4-7, 10), drum programming (2, 5), guitars (3, 4, 6, 7, 10), chorus vocals (10)
 Richie Gajate-Garcia – percussion (1, 3, 4, 6, 7, 10), chorus vocals (10)
 Danilo Arroyo – percussion (8)
 Paulina Aguirre – chorus vocals (8)
 Kenny O'Brien – chorus vocals (8)
 Cameron Smith – chorus vocals (10)

Production
 Paul Brown – producer (1-7, 10), recording (1-7, 10), mixing (1-7, 10)
 Pablo Aguirre – producer (8, 9), recording (8, 9)
 Dragan "DC" Capor – recording (1-7, 10), mixing (1-7, 10)
 Eric Astor – recording assistant (1-7, 10)
 Nick Tashjian – recording assistant (1-7, 10)
 Pepe Clark – recording assistant (8, 9)
 Abraham Pacas – recording assistant (8, 9)
 Lee Herschberg – mastering at Herschberg Mastering (Camarillo, California)
 Larissa Collins – art direction 
 Michael Gassel – package design 
 Lori Stoll – photography 
 Steve Chapman and Chapman & Co. Management, Inc. – management

Charts

References

2009 albums
Jessy J albums
Peak Records albums